Lalla vinner! (Lalla Wins!) is a Norwegian drama film from 1932. It was directed by Erling Bergendahl and George Schnéevoigt, and it starred Lalla Carlsen, Odd Frogg, and David Knudsen.

Plot
A lottery win means that the kitchen maid Lalla can check into a classy seaside hotel and pretend to be a consul. The story continues with falling in love, financial downturns, and ups and downs.

Cast

Lalla Carlsen as Lalla Hansen
Odd Frogg as Alexander Berg, a journalist
David Knudsen as Rosen, a landowner
Mimi Kihle as Ragnhild, the landowner's daughter
Harald Schwenzen as Sigurd Sadolin, a lawyer
Jens Holstad as Jonassen, a tent operator at the Tivoli amusement park
Marie Hedemark as Batzeba, a singer at Tivoli
Ulf Selmer as a groom

References

External links
 
 Lalla vinner! at the National Library of Norway
 Lalla vinner! at Filmfront

1932 films
Norwegian black-and-white films
Norwegian drama films
Norwegian musical films
1930s Norwegian-language films